Pope Julius, or Pope July, is a gambling card game of the 16th century for four or more players. Players included King Henry VIII and it appears to have been one of his and Anne Boleyn's favourite pastimes.

Very little is known about the game, and its existence is known to be attested only by three written sources, those being:

c. 1521 - John Skelton, Speke, parrot

1532 - anon, Privy Purse Expences of King Henry VIII (30 November 1532)

c. 1596 - Sir John Harington, A Treatise on Playe, in Nugae antiquae (1769)

Some sources speculate that it was the precursor to the game of Pope Joan.

References

16th-century card games
French deck card games
English card games